Vinzenz Schweighofer (born 12 September 1942) is an Austrian sports shooter. He competed in the men's 50 metre free pistol event at the 1984 Summer Olympics.

References

1942 births
Living people
Austrian male sport shooters
Olympic shooters of Austria
Shooters at the 1984 Summer Olympics
Place of birth missing (living people)
20th-century Austrian people